Max Bernhauer (24 September 1866 in Mohelnice, Austria-Hungary – 13 March 1946 in Horn, Austria) was an Austrian entomologist who specialised in Coleoptera, especially Staphylinidae. He described over 5,000 species. He studied and received a law degree from the University of Vienna in 1899. He worked as a notary to supplement his amateur studies. His collection is in the Field Museum of Natural History in Chicago.

References

External links

Oslo University Natural History Museum List of publications (vie Search)

Austrian entomologists
1866 births
1946 deaths
Notaries
Coleopterists
University of Vienna alumni
People from Mohelnice